The 2019–20 NorthEast United FC season was the club's sixth season since its establishment in 2014 and their sixth season in the Indian Super League.

Players

Current squad

Transfers

Loan return and Retained players

In

Management
As of 24 July 2019.

Competitions

Indian Super League

League table

Results summary

Results by matchday

Fixtures
League stage

Squad Statistics

Goalscorers

References

NorthEast United FC seasons
NorthEast